
Gmina Sieradz is a rural gmina (administrative district) in Sieradz County, Łódź Voivodeship, in central Poland. Its seat is the town of Sieradz, although the town is not part of the territory of the gmina.

The gmina contains part of the protected area called Warta-Widawka Landscape Park.

Villages
Gmina Sieradz contains the villages and settlements of Biskupice, Bobrowniki, Bogumiłów, Borzewisko, Chałupki, Charłupia Mała, Chojne, Czartki, Dąbrowa Wielka, Dąbrówka, Dębina, Dzierlin, Dzigorzew, Grabowiec, Grądy, Kamionaczyk, Kłocko, Kolonia Okręglica, Kowale, Kuśnie, Łosieniec, Męcka Wola, Mnichów, Okręglica, Podłężyce, Ruda, Rzechta, Sokołów, Stoczki, Sucha and Wiechucice.

Neighbouring gminas
Gmina Sieradz is bordered by the town of Sieradz and by the gminas of Brzeźnio, Burzenin, Warta, Wróblew, Zapolice and Zduńska Wola.

References
Polish official population figures 2006

Sieradz
Sieradz County